The Kingdom of Hungary, referred to retrospectively as the Regency and the Horthy era, existed as a country from 1920 to 1946 under the rule of Regent Miklós Horthy, who officially represented the Hungarian monarchy. In reality there was no king, and attempts by King Charles IV to return to the throne shortly before his death were prevented by Horthy.

Hungary under Horthy was characterized by its conservative, nationalist and fiercely anti-communist character. The government was based on an unstable alliance of conservatives and right-wingers. Foreign policy was characterized by revisionism — the total or partial revision of the Treaty of Trianon, which had seen Hungary lose over 70% of its historic territory along with over three million Hungarians, who mostly lived in the border territories outside the new borders of the kingdom. Hungary's interwar politics were dominated by a focus on the territorial losses suffered in this treaty, with the resentment continuing until the present.

Nazi Germany's influence in Hungary has led some historians to conclude that the country increasingly became a client state after 1938. The Kingdom of Hungary was an Axis Power during World War II, intent on regaining Hungarian-majority territory that had been lost in the Treaty of Trianon, which it did in early 1941. By 1944, following heavy setbacks for the Axis, Horthy's government negotiated secretly with the Allies, and also considered leaving the war. Because of this Hungary was occupied by Germany and Horthy was deposed. The extremist Arrow Cross Party's leader Ferenc Szálasi established a new Nazi-backed government, effectively turning Hungary into a German-occupied puppet state.

After World War II, the country fell within the Soviet Union's sphere of influence. It changed its name to the Hungarian State (Hungarian: Magyar Állam) and the Second Hungarian Republic was soon thereafter proclaimed in 1946, succeeded by the communist Hungarian People's Republic in 1949.

Formation 

Upon the dissolution and break-up of Austria-Hungary after World War I, the Hungarian Democratic Republic and then the Hungarian Soviet Republic were briefly proclaimed in 1918 and 1919, respectively. The short-lived communist government of Béla Kun launched what was known as the "Red Terror", involving Hungary in an ill-fated war with Romania. In 1920, the country fell into a period of civil conflict, with Hungarian anti-communists and monarchists violently purging the nation of communists, leftist intellectuals, and others whom they felt threatened by, especially Jews.  This period was known as the "White Terror". In 1920, after the pullout of the last of the Romanian occupation forces, the Kingdom of Hungary was restored.

After  the collapse of a short-lived Communist regime, according to historian István Deák:
Between 1919 and 1944 Hungary was a rightist country. Forged out of a counter-revolutionary heritage, its governments advocated a “nationalist Christian”  policy; they extolled heroism, faith, and unity; they despised the French Revolution, and they spurned the liberal and socialist ideologies of the 19th century. The governments saw  Hungary as a bulwark against bolshevism and bolshevism’s instruments: socialism, cosmopolitanism, and Freemasonry. They perpetrated the rule of a small clique of aristocrats, civil servants, and army officers, and surrounded with adulation the head of the state, the counterrevolutionary Admiral Horthy.

Regency

On 29 February 1920, a coalition of right-wing political forces united and returned Hungary to being a constitutional monarchy.  However, it was obvious that the Allies would not accept any return of the Habsburgs. Earlier, Charles IV's brother, Archduke Joseph August, had declared himself regent, but stood down after two weeks when the Allies refused to recognize him. 

It was thus decided to choose a regent to represent the monarchy until a settlement could be reached.  Miklós Horthy, the last commanding admiral of the Austro-Hungarian Navy, was chosen for this position on 1 March. Sándor Simonyi-Semadam was the first Prime Minister of Horthy's regency.

In 1921 Charles returned in Hungary and tried to retake its throne, even trying to march on Budapest with some rebel troops in October 1921; however, his attempts failed as much of the Royal Hungarian Army remained loyal to Horthy and thus Charles was arrested and exiled to Madeira.

On 6 November 1921 the Diet of Hungary passed a law nullifying the Pragmatic Sanction of 1713, dethroning Charles IV and abolishing the House of Habsburg's rights to the throne of Hungary. Hungary was a kingdom without royalty. With civil unrest too great to select a new king, it was decided to confirm Horthy as Regent of Hungary. He remained in that powerful president-like status until he was overthrown in 1944.

Government 

Horthy's rule as Regent possessed characteristics such that it could be construed a dictatorship. As a counterpoint, his powers were a continuation of the constitutional powers of the King of Hungary, adopted earlier during the federation with the Austrian Empire.  As Regent, Horthy had the power to adjourn or dissolve the Hungarian Diet (parliament) at his own discretion; he appointed the Hungarian Prime Minister.

The succession after Horthy's death or resignation was never officially established; presumably the Hungarian Parliament would have selected a new regent, or possibly attempted to restore the Habsburgs under Crown Prince Otto. In January 1942, Parliament appointed Horthy's eldest son István as Deputy Regent and expected successor. Whether this represents an attempt to gradually re-establish monarchy in Hungary is unclear; at any rate, István was killed in an airplane crash in August that year, and a new Deputy Regent was not appointed.

During his first ten years, Horthy led increased repression of Hungarian minorities. In 1920, the numerus clausus law formally placed limits on the number of minority students at university, and legalized corporal punishment for adults in criminal cases. Although the law seemingly applied in equal measure to all minorities, the ethnicity quota system was never fully introduced and the law acted largely to conceal anti-Jewish action from foreign observers. Limitations were relaxed in 1928. Racial criteria in admitting new students were removed and replaced by social criteria. Five categories were set up: civil servants, war veterans and army officers, small landowners and artisans, industrialists, and the merchant classes. Under István Bethlen as Prime Minister  the electoral system was changed to reintroduce an open vote system outside Budapest and its vicinity and cities with county municipal rights. Bethlen's political party, the Party of Unity, won repeated elections. Bethlen pushed for revision of the Treaty of Trianon. After the collapse of the Hungarian economy from 1929 to 1931, national turmoil pushed Bethlen to resign as Prime Minister. In 1938 the changes to the electoral system were reversed.

Social conditions in the kingdom did not improve as time passed, as a very small proportion of the population continued to control much of the country's wealth. Jews were continually pressured to assimilate into Hungarian mainstream culture.  The desperate situation forced the Regent, Horthy, to accept the far-right politician Gyula Gömbös as Prime Minister. He pledged to retain the existing political system. Gömbös agreed to  abandon his extreme anti-Semitism and allow some Jews into the government.

In power, Gömbös moved Hungary towards a one-party government like those of Fascist Italy and Nazi Germany. Pressure by Nazi Germany for extreme anti-Semitism forced Gömbös out and Hungary pursued anti-Semitism under its "Jewish Laws". Initially, the government passed laws restricting Jews to 20 percent in a number of professions. Later it scapegoated the Jews for the country's failing economy.

In March 1944, responding to the advancing Soviet forces, Prime Minister Miklós Kállay, with Horthy's backing, established contacts with the Allies in order to open negotiations and switch sides; however, this became known to the Germans, who proceeded to invade Hungary and quickly overran the country, meeting only limited resistance. With the country now under German occupation, Horthy was forced to remove Kállay from his position and appoint pro-Nazi politician Döme Sztójay as new Prime Minister. Sztójay legalized the antisemitic and pro-Nazi Arrow Cross Party, deported large numbers of Hungarian Jews to Germany and initiated a violent crackdown on liberal and leftist opposition.

As the months went by, Horthy became increasingly appalled Sztójay's brutal methods and alarmed by the rapidly collapsing Eastern Front. In August 1944, he deposed the pro-German Prime Minister and installed a more balanced government led by Géza Lakatos, in an effort to engage with the Allies and avoid occupation by the Soviet Union. This did not sit well with Hitler and, in October, German forces overthrew Horthy and Lakatos and installed a puppet regime led by Ferenc Szálasi of the Arrow Cross Party. The Arrow Cross Party never abolished the Monarchy as a form of government, and Hungarian newspapers continued to refer to the country as the Kingdom of Hungary (Magyar Királyság), although Magyarország (Hungary) was used as an alternative. From May to June 1944, Hungarian authorities rapidly rounded up and transported hundreds of thousands of Hungarian Jews to Nazi concentration camps, where most died.

After the fall of the Szálasi regime, a Soviet-backed government under Béla Miklós was nominally left in control of the entire country. A High National Council was appointed in January to assume the Regency, and included members of the Hungarian Communist Party, like Ernő Gerő, and later Mátyás Rákosi and László Rajk.

Economy 

Upon the kingdom's establishment soon after World War I, the country suffered from economic decline, budget deficits, and high inflation as a result of the loss of economically important territories under the Treaty of Trianon, including Czechoslovakia, Romania, and Yugoslavia. The land losses of the Treaty of Trianon in 1920 caused Hungary to lose agricultural and industrial areas, making it dependent on exporting products from what agricultural land it had left to maintain its economy. Prime Minister István Bethlen's government dealt with the economic crisis by seeking large foreign loans, which allowed the country to achieve monetary stabilization in the early 1920s. He introduced a new currency in 1927, the pengő. Industrial and farm production rose rapidly, and the country benefited from flourishing foreign trade during most of the 1920s.

Following the start of the Great Depression in 1929, the prosperity rapidly collapsed in the country, especially in part due to the economic effects of the failure of the Österreichische Creditanstalt bank in Vienna, Austria. From the mid-1930s to the 1940s, after relations improved with Germany, Hungary's economy benefited from trade. The Hungarian economy became dependent on that of Germany.

Foreign policy 

Initially, despite a move towards nationalism, the new state under Horthy, in an effort to prevent further conflicts, signed the Treaty of Trianon on 4 June 1920, thereby reducing Hungary's size substantially: the whole of Transylvania was taken by Romania; much of Upper Hungary became part of Czechoslovakia; Vojvodina was assigned to the Kingdom of Serbs, Croats, and Slovenes (known after 1929 as Yugoslavia); and the Free State of Fiume was created.

With a succession of increasingly nationalist Prime Ministers, Hungary steadily came to repent the Treaty of Trianon, and aligned itself with Europe's two fascist states, Germany and Italy, which both opposed the changes to national borders in Europe at the end of World War I. The Italian Fascist dictator Benito Mussolini sought closer ties with Hungary, beginning with the signing of a treaty of friendship between Hungary and Italy on 5 April 1927. Gyula Gömbös was an open admirer of the fascist leaders. Gömbös attempted to forge a closer trilateral unity between Germany, Italy and Hungary by acting as an intermediary between Germany and Italy, whose two fascist regimes had nearly come to conflict in 1934 over the issue of Austrian independence.  Gömbös eventually persuaded Mussolini to accept Hitler's annexation of Austria in the late 1930s. Gömbös is said to have coined the phrase "axis", which he applied to his intention to create an alliance with Germany and Italy; those two countries used it to term their alliance as the Rome–Berlin axis. Just prior to the Second World War, Hungary benefited from its close ties with Germany and Italy when the Munich Agreement obliged Czechoslovakia and Hungary to settle their territorial disputes by negotiation. Finally, the First Vienna Award reassigned the southern parts of Czechoslovakia to Hungary, and shortly after Czechoslovakia was abolished Hungary occupied and annexed the remainder of the Carpatho-Ukraine.

World War II

After the successful revision policy Hungary sought further solutions to the remainder of its former territories and demanded the concession of Transylvanian territory from Romania. The Axis powers were not interested in opening a new conflict in Central Europe; both countries were facing strong diplomatic pressures to avoid any military operations. Finally both parties accepted the arbitration of Germany and Italy, known as the Second Vienna Award, and as a result Northern Transylvania was assigned to Hungary. Shortly afterward, the Kingdom of Hungary joined the Axis powers. Hitler demanded that the Hungarian government follow Germany's military and racial agenda to avoid potential conflict in the future. Anti-Semitism was already an established political cause by the far right in Hungary. In 1944, after the ousting of Horthy by Hitler and before the installation of the National-Socialist Arrow Cross Party, the Hungarian government readily aided Nazi Germany in the deportation of hundreds of thousands of Jews to concentration camps during the Holocaust, where most of them died.

In April 1941, Hungary let the Wehrmacht into her territory, thus supporting Germany and Italy in the invasion of Yugoslavia. After the Independent State of Croatia was proclaimed, Hungary joined the military operations and was allowed to annex the Bačka (Bácska) region in Vojvodina, which had a majority of Hungarians, as well as the region of Muraköz (present-day Prekmurje and Medjimurje), which had large Slovenian and Croatian minorities, respectively.

On 27 June 1941, László Bárdossy declared war on the Soviet Union. Fearing a potential turn of support to the Romanians, the Hungarian government sent armed forces to support the German war effort during Operation Barbarossa. This support cost the Hungarians dearly.  The entire Hungarian Second Army was lost during the Battle of Stalingrad.

By early 1944, with Soviet forces fast advancing from the east, Hungary was caught attempting to contact the British and the Americans to secretly escape the war and establish an armistice with the Allies. On 19 March 1944, the Germans responded by invading Hungary in Operation Margarethe.  German forces occupied key locations to ensure Hungarian loyalty. They placed Horthy under house arrest and replaced Prime Minister Miklós Kállay with a more pliable successor. Döme Sztójay, an avid supporter of the Nazis, became the new Hungarian Prime Minister. Sztójay governed with the aid of a Nazi military governor, Edmund Veesenmayer: he legalized the antisemitic and pro-Nazi Arrow Cross Party, started to deport Hungarian Jews en masse to Germany and initiated a violent crackdown on liberal and leftist opposition. Increasingly appalled by Sztójay's methods and alarmed by the imminent collapse of the Eastern Front, Horthy was finally able to remove him in August 1944 and replaced him with the more balanced Géza Lakatos.

By October of the same year, the Hungarians were again caught trying to quit the war, and the Germans launched Operation Panzerfaust. They replaced Horthy with Arrow Cross leader Ferenc Szálasi. A new pro-German "Government of National Unity" was proclaimed, and it continued the war on the side of the Axis. Szálasi did not replace Horthy as Regent, but was appointed as the "Leader of the Nation" (Nemzetvezető) and Prime Minister of the new Hungarian Fascist regime. Antisemitic persecution and pogroms increased during Szálasi's regime and his militias were singularly responsible of the murder of 10,000-15,000 Hungarian Jews. 

The new Quisling regime, however, was to be short-lived, for in November 1944 the Red Army had already reached Budapest and a long siege started, while Szálasi fled the capital. On 21 December 1944, a Hungarian "Interim Assembly" met in Debrecen, with the approval of the Soviet Union. This assembly elected an interim counter-government headed by Béla Miklós, the former commander of the Hungarian First Army. 

Budapest capitulated in February 1945 and the so-called Government of National Unity, now in exile in Munich, was disbanded at the end of March 1945.

Dissolution

Under Soviet occupation, the fate of the Kingdom of Hungary was already determined. A High National Council was appointed as the country's collective Head of State until the monarchy was formally abolished on 1 February 1946. The regency was replaced by the Second Hungarian Republic. It was quickly followed by the creation of the Hungarian People's Republic.

Historical assessment
There has been some debate as to what extent the Hungarian state of the 1930s and '40s can be classified as fascist. According to Richard Griffiths, the regime's increasing economic dependence on Germany, its passage of anti-Semitic legislation and its participation in exterminating local Jews all place it within the realm of international fascism.

See also 
Hungary between the World Wars
Hungary during World War II

Allied powers of World War II
Axis powers of World War II
Hungarian volunteers in the Winter War

Notes

Citations

External links

|align="center"| Preceded by

|align="center" style="padding:0 1.0em 0;"| Kingdom of Hungaryalso known as theRegency1920–1946
|align="center"| 

 
Hungary
Former countries of the interwar period
.
Modern history of Hungary
Territorial evolution of Hungary
Hungary in World War II
.
.
1940s in Hungary
States and territories established in 1920
States and territories disestablished in 1946
1920 establishments in Hungary
1946 disestablishments in Hungary
20th century in Hungary
Axis powers